Rushforth is an English surname. Notable people with the surname include:

 Alfred Rushforth (1898–1985), Australian cricketer
 James Rushforth, British photographer, mountaineer, climber, and travel writer
 Peter Rushforth (1945–2005), English teacher and novelist
 Winifred Rushforth (1885–1983), Scottish medic

English-language surnames